The Itabapoana is a river forming the border between Espírito Santo and Rio de Janeiro states in eastern Brazil.

See also
List of rivers of Espírito Santo
List of rivers of Minas Gerais
List of rivers of Rio de Janeiro

References
Brazilian Ministry of Transport

Rivers of Espírito Santo
Rivers of Minas Gerais
Rivers of Rio de Janeiro (state)